Falce e Martello (English:  Hammer and Sickle) was an Italian-language communist weekly newspaper published as the organ of the Communist Party of Switzerland in Ticino.

History
It was founded in 1925 by a Ticinian worker, Walter Barrizi.

The newspaper was published in Lugano from July 1925, then moved publication to Basel in 1928 and to Zurich in October 1934. After moving to Zurich, publication would return to Lugano, and then return to Zurich again.

Officially, it was produced by a group of German-speaking Swiss communists as its editors, E. Arnold and J. Rausch and F. Wieser. In reality, however, the newspaper was managed by Italian-speaking communists.

The newspaper ceased publication in October 1936, because of financial constraints. It would be replaced by the newspaper Il Popolo.

See also

 List of newspapers in Switzerland

References

1925 establishments in Switzerland
1936 disestablishments in Switzerland
Communist newspapers
Defunct newspapers published in Switzerland
Defunct weekly newspapers
Italian-language newspapers published in Switzerland
Mass media in Basel
Mass media in Lugano
Newspapers published in Zürich
Publications established in 1925
Publications disestablished in 1936
Weekly newspapers published in Switzerland